Pilsbryspira melchersi is a species of sea snail, a marine gastropod mollusk in the family Pseudomelatomidae, the turrids and allies.

Description
The shell attains a length of 9 mm.

Distribution
This species occurs in the Pacific Ocean from Mexico to Panama

References

External links
 
 Gastropods.com: Pilsbryspira melchersi

melchersi
Gastropods described in 1852